Banksia trifontinalis is a species of openly-branched shrub that is endemic to the southwest of Western Australia. It has broadly linear, coarsely serrated, sharply pointed leaves, pale yellow flowers in heads of about sixty, and oblong to egg-shaped follicles.

Description
Banksia trifontinalis is an openly branched shrub that typically grows to a height of  but does not form a lignotuber. There are between five and ten sharply-pointed triangular teeth on each side of the leaves.

Taxonomy
The type specimen was collected west of Three Springs, Western Australia by Alex George on 6 August 1986. George published a description of the species in 1996 in the journal Nuytsia, naming it Dryandra trifontinalis. The specific epithet is from the Latin tri- ("three") and fontinalis ("of a spring"), in reference to the town of Three Springs.

In 2007, all Dryandra species were transferred to Banksia by Austin Mast and Kevin Thiele and this species was given the name Banksia trifontinalis.

Distribution and habitat

Banksia trifontinalis occurs only in a few populations in the vicinity of Arrino and Three Springs in the Geraldton Sandplains biogeographic region. It is locally common, and grows on lateritic soil in low woodland.

Conservation status
This banksia is classified as "Priority Three" by the Government of Western Australia Department of Parks and Wildlife meaning that it is poorly known and known from only a few locations but is not under imminent threat.

References

trifontinalis
Endemic flora of Western Australia
Plants described in 1996
Taxa named by Alex George